Sandwich vertebral body is a radiologic sign where the endplates of the vertebra are sclerotic, giving it the appearance of a sandwich. This sign is seen in osteoporosis, particularly in the autosomal dominant variety.

References

Radiologic signs